Scrainwood is a hamlet and former civil parish  from Morpeth, now in the parish of Alnham, in the county of Northumberland, England. In 1951 the parish had a population of 16. Scrainwood Estate is 1048 acres and has a shoot that specializes in partridges.

History 
The name "Scrainwood" is uncertain and may mean 'shrew-mouse wood' or 'villain wood' or it could mean 'hollow-place wood'. Until 1509 Scrainwood manor was in William Vescy's barony. Scrainwood is a deserted medieval village that appeared to have declined in the 15 or 16th century. There are earthwork remains of at least 3 probable house platforms. Names recorded include Screnwood, Scenwood, Screenwood, Skrynwood, Scranwood, Screynwood, Scrynwood and Skranwoo. Scrainwood was a township in Alnham parish. From 1866 Scrainwood was a civil parish in its own right until it was merged with Alnham on 1 April 1955.

References 

Hamlets in Northumberland
Former civil parishes in Northumberland